The 2011 BNP Paribas Open was a tennis tournament played at Indian Wells, California in March 2011. It was the 38th edition for the men's & 23rd for the women's event. This article displays the qualifying draw of the 2011 BNP Paribas Open men's singles.

Players

Seeds

Qualifiers

Qualifying draw

First qualifier

Second qualifier

Third qualifier

Fourth qualifier

Fifth qualifier

Sixth qualifier

Seventh qualifier

Eighth qualifier

Ninth qualifier

Tenth qualifier

Eleventh qualifier

Twelfth qualifier

References
 Qualifying Draw

BNP Paribas Open - Singles Qualifying
2011 BNP Paribas Open
Qualification for tennis tournaments